Kevi is a village in Serbia.

Kevi may also refer to:

 Kevi Lee Luper (born 1990), American women's college basketball player
 Kevi, the lead singer of rap group 1000 Clowns
 KEVI, a member of American music trio Cheat Codes
 KEVI, a school in Morpeth Northumberland